Martin C. Dean (born March 14, 1962, in London, Ph.D. in history from Queens' College, Cambridge) is a research scholar at the Center for Advanced Holocaust Studies, United States Holocaust Memorial Museum (USHMM). He formerly worked as an historian at the Metropolitan Police War Crimes Unit, Scotland Yard.

Selected publications
"The German Gendarmerie, the Ukrainian Schutzmannschaft and the 'Second Wave' of Jewish Killings in Occupied Ukraine: German Policing at the Local Level in the Zhitomir Region, 1941-1944". German History, 14 (2) (1996): 168–192.
Collaboration in the Holocaust: Crimes of the local police in Belorussia and Ukraine, 1941–1944. Palgrave Macmillan, 2000. 
Confiscation of Jewish property in Europe, 1933–1945, new sources and perspectives. Center for Advanced Holocaust Studies, 2003. (Foreword with Paul A. Shapiro)
Robbery and restitution: The conflict over Jewish property in Europe. Berghahn Books, 2007.  (Editor with Constantin Goschler and Philipp Ther)
Robbing the Jews: The confiscation of Jewish property in the Holocaust, 1933-1945. Cambridge University Press, 2008. 
The United States Holocaust Memorial Museum Encyclopedia of Camps and Ghettos, 1933–1945: Ghettos in German-occupied Eastern Europe Volume II. Indiana University Press, 2012.  (volume editor)

Awards 

 2008: National Jewish Book Award in the Writing Based on Archival Material category for Robbing the Jews

References 

Living people
Historians of the Holocaust
1962 births
Historians of Nazism
British historians
United States Holocaust Memorial Museum